Ross Copperman (born October 1, 1982) is a Grammy-nominated American singer-songwriter and producer with 29 number one radio hits. After his experience as an artist in the UK, Copperman discovered his talent for writing and producing country music. He has written several No. 1 songs including notable hits like Billy Currington's "Don't It", Luke Bryan's "Strip It Down" and Keith Urban's "John Cougar, John Deere, John 3:16". Copperman has also produced for several artists including Keith Urban, Brett Eldredge, Dierks Bentley, Eli Young Band, Darius Rucker, and Jake Owen among others. Recently, Copperman's song "Woman, Amen" recorded by Dierks Bentley charted at No. 1 on the Billboard Country Charts on June 11, 2018. Kenny Chesney's single "Get Along" was also co-penned by Copperman, adding to his list of over 30 total written and produced No. 1 country singles. Copperman continues to impact weekly Billboard country charts in collaboration with Sony Music Publishing in Nashville.

Biography

Early life 
Copperman was born an grew up in Roanoke, Virginia. He attended Glenvar High School in Roanoke County. He started playing the piano at age 3, and started writing songs in college at James Madison University. The first song he wrote is titled "Fly Away", and it appears on his studio debut album. He says that it was only after the urging of his teacher (who had listened to this song) that he was convinced to take up music professionally.

Early career 
Ross signed with Phonogenic Records in the UK and began working on his debut album in 2006. The first single he released, "As I Choke", managed to be the most popular iTunes Single of the Week in the UK, notching up 36,457 downloads in a one-week period.

His second single, "All She Wrote", entered the UK top 40 in May 2007, and was featured in a couple of American TV shows.
The third single, "Found You", was released a few months later.
His debut album, Welcome to Reality, was released on May 28, 2007.
Ross Copperman's original Christmas song "Christmas Time" was released on iTunes on November 20, 2008.
Ross Copperman's EP "This is Ross Copperman" was released on iTunes on November 16, 2009.

Present career 
Despite the success of his UK debut, Copperman decided to relocate to Nashville to focus on songwriting and production. In this period he wrote other notable hits including, "Glass" by Thompson Square, "Tip It On Back" by Dierks Bentley, "Pirate Flag" by Kenny Chesney, "Lay Low" by Josh Turner, "Trouble" by Gloriana and Prizefighter" by Trisha Yearwood.

Ross has had numerous major synch placements in TV shows and movies, such as CSI: NY, The Vampire Diaries, The Biggest Loser, NCIS, Nashville and Grey's Anatomy which featured his song "The Stars Are On Your Side" in S15, E22.

Awards and nominations

Discography

Albums
2003: Believe
2007: Welcome to Reality
2009: This Is Ross Copperman
2012: Holding On and Letting Go
2012: My Love Will
2013: Lighthouse Shine EP

Singles
2006: "As I Choke" (iTunes Single)
2007: "All She Wrote"
2007: "Found You"
2008: "Bleeding Love"
2008: "Christmas Time"
2015: "Hunger"

Number One Hits
Listed are the No. 1 country hits Ross Copperman has co-written, as recorded by the artists below:

2013
"Beat of the Music", recorded by Brett Eldredge
"Point At You", recorded by Justin Moore

2014
"Confession", recorded by Florida Georgia Line

2015
"Don't It", recorded by Billy Currington 
"Drunk On Your Love", recorded by Brett Eldredge
"Lose My Mind", recorded by Brett Eldredge
"Smoke", recorded by A Thousand Horses
"Strip It Down", recorded by Luke Bryan

2016
"American Country Love Song", recorded by Jake Owen
"Break On Me", recorded by Keith Urban
"I Know Somebody", recorded by LoCash
"John Cougar, John Deere, John 3:16", recorded by Keith Urban
"Setting The World On Fire", recorded by Kenny Chesney featuring P!nk

2017
"If I Told You", recorded by Darius Rucker
"Wanna Be That Song", recorded by Brett Eldredge
"Black", recorded by Dierks Bentley

2018
"Get Along", recorded by Kenny Chesney
"Woman, Amen", recorded by Dierks Bentley

2019
"Love Someone", recorded by Brett Eldredge
"Love Ain't", recorded by the Eli Young Band
“Living”, recorded by Dierks Bentley

2020
"What She Wants Tonight", recorded by Luke Bryan
"Catch", recorded by Brett Young
“Happy Anywhere”, recorded by Blake Shelton ft. Gwen Stefani
“Nobody But You”, recorded by Blake Shelton ft. Gwen Stefani

2021 
"Beers and Sunshine", recorded by Darius Rucker

Songwriting discography

Select production discography

Mixing credits

References

External links
Ross Copperman on Myspace
Welcome To Reality Independent Review
Music City Unsigned Artist Page

1982 births
James Madison University alumni
American male singer-songwriters
Living people
People from Roanoke, Virginia
Singer-songwriters from Virginia
21st-century American singers
21st-century American male singers